Amathina tricarinata  is a species of small sea snail, marine heterobranch gastropod mollusc or micromolluscs in the family Amathinidae.

Distribution 
This marine species occurs in the Mediterranean Sea (as a non-indigenous species), the Red Sea and off Madagascar.

References

 Dautzenberg, Ph. (1929). Contribution à l'étude de la faune de Madagascar: Mollusca marina testacea. Faune des colonies françaises, III(fasc. 4). Société d'Editions géographiques, maritimes et coloniales: Paris. 321-636, plates IV-VII pp.
 Vine, P. (1986). Red Sea Invertebrates. Immel Publishing, London. 224 pp.
 Ponder, W. F. 1987. The anatomy and relationships of the pyramidellacean limpet, Amathina tricarinata (Mollusca: Gastropoda). Asian Marine Biology 4: 1-34. page(s): 30
 Rosenberg, G. 1992. Encyclopedia of Seashells. Dorset: New York. 224 pp.
Streftaris, N.; Zenetos, A.; Papathanassiou, E. (2005). Globalisation in marine ecosystems: the story of non-indigenous marine species across European seas. Oceanogr. Mar. Biol. Annu. Rev. 43: 419-453

Amathinidae
Gastropods described in 1767
Taxa named by Carl Linnaeus